Events from the year 1926 in Scotland.

Incumbents 

 Secretary for Scotland and Keeper of the Great Seal – Sir John Gilmour, Bt until post abolished 26 July
 Secretary of State for Scotland and Keeper of the Great Seal, from 15 July – Sir John Gilmour, Bt

Law officers 
 Lord Advocate – William Watson
 Solicitor General for Scotland – Alexander Munro MacRobert

Judiciary 
 Lord President of the Court of Session and Lord Justice General – Lord Clyde
 Lord Justice Clerk – Lord Alness
 Chairman of the Scottish Land Court – Lord St Vigeans

Events 
 29 January – Dunbartonshire and East Renfrewshire by-elections: Conservatives retain the seats.
 26 March – Bothwell by-election: Labour retains the seat.
 3 – 12 May: 1926 United Kingdom general strike. Some violence in Glasgow.
 26 November – launch, under the auspices of the Scots National League, of a new monthly Nationalist newspaper entitled The Scots Independent.
 Findhorn Bridge near Tomatin completed.
 First stage of Lanark Hydro Electric Scheme constructed.
 Scotland's only sugar beet processing plant is opened at Cupar.
 Sacramento River sternwheel paddle steamers Delta King and Delta Queen are shipped from William Denny and Brothers' yard at Dumbarton to California.
 The post of Secretary for Scotland upgraded to a full Secretary of State appointment

Births 
 13 January – Craigie Aitchison, painter (died 2009)
 17 January – Moira Shearer, ballet dancer (died 2006 in England)
 11 February – Alexander Gibson, conductor and opera intendant (died 1995)
 19 February – Charlie Cox, footballer (died 2008)
 8 March – Edith MacArthur, actress (died 2018)
 12 March – Gudrun Ure, actress
 22 March – Alastair Reid, poet and scholar of South American literature (died 2014 in the United States)
 1 April – William Macpherson, High Court judge and clan chief (died 2021)
 3 April – Andrew Keir, actor (died 1997 in England)
 22 April – James Stirling, architect (died 1992 in England)
 May – Duncan Campbell, trumpet player
 24 May – Stanley Baxter, comic actor
 2 July – Morag Beaton, dramatic soprano (died 2010 in Australia)
 3 August – Rona Anderson, actress (died 2013 in England)
 15 August – D. E. R. Watt, historian (died 2004)
 4 September – George William Gray, chemist, pioneer of liquid crystal technology (died 2013)
 12 September – Dave Valentine, international rugby player (died 1976)
 17 October – Archie Duncan, historian (died 2017)
 9 November – Johnny Beattie, comedian (died 2020)

Deaths 
 2 January – John Gray McKendrick, physiologist, Regius Professor of Physiology at the University of Glasgow (born 1841)
 3 February – Archibald White Maconochie, businessman and MP (born 1855)
 4 April – John McTavish footballer (born 1885)
 31 July – John McPherson, international footballer (born 1868)
 4 September – Alexander Morison McAldowie, physician, folklorist and ornithologist (born 1852)

The arts
 22 November – Hugh MacDiarmid's Scots language poem A Drunk Man Looks at the Thistle is published.

See also 
 Timeline of Scottish history
 1926 in Northern Ireland

References 

 
Years of the 20th century in Scotland
Scotland
1920s in Scotland